A by-election was held for the New South Wales Legislative Assembly electorate of Macleay on 29 May 1893 because of the resignation of Otho Dangar due to insolvency.

Dates

Result

The by-election was caused by the resignation of Otho Dangar due to bankruptcy.

See also
Electoral results for the district of Macleay
List of New South Wales state by-elections

Notes

References

1893 elections in Australia
New South Wales state by-elections
1890s in New South Wales